The Grand America Hotel is the largest hotel in Salt Lake City, Utah, United States. Located at 555 South Main Street, Salt Lake City, 84111, it is one block away from Washington Square in the downtown area. It was commissioned and built in 2001 by Earl Holding, and designed by Frank Nicholson.  The architect was Smallwood Reynolds Stewart and Stewart.   Frank Nicholson was the Interior Designer.  

It is the eighth-tallest building in Salt Lake City, and the tallest hotel with 24 floors.

It has been home to conferences, lectures and is also frequently used by visiting professional sports teams. For example, in October 2013, Condoleezza Rice gave a speech at the hotel.

See also
 List of hotels in the United States
 Grand America Hotels & Resorts

References

External references

 

2001 establishments in Utah
Hotel buildings completed in 2001
Skyscraper hotels in Utah
Skyscrapers in Salt Lake City